Lewis Leonard Forman (29 June 1929 – 16 June 1998) was a British botanist, born in London. He was an expert on spermatophytes, particularly Menispermaceae, and specialised in the plants of Southeast Asia. He graduated from the University of London in 1950 and was appointed to the staff of the Royal Botanic Gardens, Kew in 1951, serving as a senior official there from 1966 to 1989.

Forman was honoured with his eponymous species:
 (Euphorbiaceae) Glochidion formanii Airy Shaw
 (Lauraceae) Litsea formanii Kosterm.
 (Melastomataceae) Medinilla formanii Regalado
 (Menispermaceae) Stephania formanii Kundu & S.Guha
 (Menispermaceae) Tinospora formanii Udayan & Pradeep

References

External links 
Flora of the Darwin Region

20th-century British botanists
Alumni of the University of London
1929 births
1998 deaths